Prefectural elections for the Tokyo Metropolitan Assembly (平成29年/2017年東京都議会議員選挙, Heisei 29-nen/2017-nen Tōkyō togikai giin senkyo, "Heisei 29/2017 election of members of the Tokyo Metropolitan Assembly") were held on 2 July 2017. The 127 members were elected in forty-two electoral districts, seven returning single members elected by first-past-the-post, and thirty-five returning multiple members under single non-transferable vote. Four districts had their magnitude adjusted in this election to match population changes.

The results of the election persuaded Shinzo Abe to call a snap election, and led to the resignation of Renho as Democratic Party leader.

Background 
LDP leader Shinzo Abe took office as Prime Minister following the 2012 general election and strengthened his position in the 2014 general election. However, Abe's government was subsequently struck by criticism for its handling of the Moritomo Gakuen scandal and controversial remarks by Defense Minister Tomomi Inada. In the meantime, Yuriko Koike won the 2016 Tokyo gubernatorial election as an independent candidate, and left the LDP in June 2017 to found a new local political party, Tomin First, to challenge the LDP in the prefectural election. At the time of the election, Koike was widely believed to be eyeing a future bid to replace Abe as prime minister.

Candidates

Results 
With counting almost complete, the seat distribution was as follows:
 Supporters of Yuriko Koike won 79 seats in total: 49 by Tomin First no Kai, 23 by Kōmeitō, 1 by the Seikatsusha Net, and 6 by independents endorsed by Tomin;
 The LDP, previously the largest party, fell to 23 seats, their worst-ever result (their worst scores had previously been 38 seats, in the 1965 and 2009 elections);
 The Communist Party won 19 seats, improving further on their strong 2013 result;
 The DP was reduced to five seats and the single Ishin no Kai incumbent defended his seat.
Months after the Tokyo prefectural election, Abe called a snap general election for October 2017, and Koike established the new Kibo no To party to challenge the LDP nationally.

By district

Most districts are coterminous with a municipality (-ku/-shi/-chō/-son) of the same name. The following districts comprise multiple municipalities:
 Nishi-Tama ("West Tama“; follows the original boundaries of the district of the same name, except Ōme): Fussa, Hamura, Akiruno, Hinohara, Hinode, Mizuho, Okutama
 Minami-Tama ("South Tama“; follows the boundaries of the former district of the same name): Tama, Inagi
 Kita-Tama dai-1 ("North Tama #1“; follows the boundaries of the former Kitatama district): Higashi-Murayama, Higashi-Yamato, Musashi-Murayama
 Kita-Tama dai-2 ("North Tama #2“): Kokubunji, Kunitachi
 Kita-Tama dai-3 ("North Tama #3“): Chōfu, Komae
 Kita-Tama dai-4 ("North Tama #4“): Kiyose, Higashi-Kurume
 Islands: Aogashima, Hachijō, Mikurajima, Miyake, Ogasawara, Kōzushima, Niijima, Ōshima, Toshima

Same-day elections 
On the same day, the mayoral election in Kokubunji, Tokyo returned incumbent Kunio Izawa, backed by LDP and Komeito, against center-left supported (DP, JCP, LP, SDP, Net) former deputy mayor Michio Higuchi. Another prefectural election on July 2 was the gubernatorial election in Hyōgo.

References

External links 
 Tokyo Metropolitan Government, Secretariat of the election administration commission: Turnout and Results of the 2017 Metropolitan Assembly election (pdf/excel) 

2017 in Tokyo
Tokyo prefectural elections
July 2017 events in Japan
2017 elections in Japan